Events from the 8th century in England.

Events
 700
Osgyth, Abbess of Chich in Essex, is killed.
 Approximate date – Beverley Minster is founded by John of Beverley.
 704
 Æthelred of Mercia abdicates to become a monk at Bardney and is succeeded as king by his nephew Coenred.
 705
Wilfrid is re-instated as Bishop of Ripon.
 Bede completes his first chronological work.
 Approximate date
 The Diocese of Sherborne is created from part of that of Winchester with Aldhelm as first bishop.
 John of Beverley is elevated from Bishop of Hexham to Bishop of York.
 709
 Coenred of Mercia abdicates to become a monk in Rome and is succeeded as king by his cousin Ceolred.
 710
 Picts unsuccessfully invade Northumbria.
 Approximate date – Bishop Wilfrid dies at Oundle.
 715
 Approximate date – Completion of Lindisfarne Gospels.
 716
 Æthelbald becomes King of Mercia on the death of Ceolred, marking the beginning of that kingdom's ascendancy over the other Saxon realms.
 The 'Codex Amiatinus', the earliest surviving complete manuscript of the Vulgate, produced at Monkwearmouth–Jarrow Abbey, is taken to Italy as a gift to the Pope.
 721
 Death of Bishop Eadfrith of Lindisfarne.
 722
 King Ine of Wessex fails to conquer Cornwall, being defeated at the three battles of Hehil, Garth Maelog, and Pencon.
 725
 23 April – King Wihtred of Kent dies leaving the Anglo-Saxon Kingdom of Kent to his three sons: Æthelberht II, Eadberht and Alric.
 726
 King Ine of Wessex abdicates to travel to Rome and is succeeded by Æthelheard.
 Before 730
Northumbria annexes Rheged.
 731
 Bede completes his Historia ecclesiastica gentis Anglorum (Ecclesiastical History of the English People).
 13 January – death of Berhtwald, Archbishop of Canterbury. He is succeeded by Tatwine.
 732
Wilfrid II resigns the Bishopric of York and is succeeded by Ecgbert who establishes a library and school in York.
 734
 30 July – death of Tatwine, Archbishop of Canterbury. He is succeeded by Nothhelm.
 735
 Bishopric of York elevated to an Archbishopric; Ecgbert becomes the first Archbishop.
 736
 King Æthelbald of Mercia describes himself as "King of Britain".
 739
 17 October – death of Nothhelm, Archbishop of Canterbury. He is succeeded by Cuthbert.
 740
 Approximate date – Æthelheard of Wessex is succeeded by Cuthred.
 747
 First Council of Clofeshoh reforms the Church.
 749
 Edict of Gumley: Church freed from its economic obligations to the King of Mercia.
 750
 King Eadberht of Northumbria invades the Kingdom of Strathclyde, capturing Kyle.
 752
 Battle of Beorhford: Cuthred of Wessex defeats Æthelbald of Mercia at Battle Edge, Burford, Oxfordshire.
 753
 Cuthred of Wessex fights the Cornish.
 756
 King Eadberht captures Dumbarton, capital of Strathclyde.
 757
 King Æthelbald of Mercia murdered; succeeded by Offa.
 King Sigeberht of Wessex deposed and murdered; succeeded by Cynewulf.
 Wat's Dyke constructed.
 758
 King Eadberht of Northumbria abdicates to enter a monastery at York; succeeded by his son Oswulf.
 759
 24 July – King Oswulf of Northumbria is murdered at Market Weighton; succeeded by Æthelwald Moll (crowned 5 August).
 760
Battle of Hereford: Battle between Mercia and the Welsh; Dyfnwal ap Tewdwr dies.
 26 October – death of Cuthbert, Archbishop of Canterbury. He is succeeded by Bregowine (consecrated 27 September 761).
 761
 6 August – Battle of Eildon: King Æthelwald Moll of Northumbria defeats and kills a rival, Oswine, in a 3-day battle in Scotland.
 764
 Offa conquers Kent.
 August – death of Bregowine, Archbishop of Canterbury. He is succeeded by Jænberht (consecrated 2 February 765 at Offa's court).
 765
 30 October  – King Æthelwald Moll of Northumbria deposed; succeeded by Alhred.
 771
 Offa conquers Sussex.
 774
 Offa first uses the title "King of the English".
 King Alhred of Northumbria is deposed; succeeded by Æthelred.
 776
Battle of Otford: Kent expels the Mercians.
 778
 Offa raids Dyfed.
 779
 Æthelred I of Northumbria is deposed for the first time; succeeded by Ælfwald I of Northumbria
 779
 Hygeberht becomes Bishop of Lichfield.
 784
 Offa raids Wales.
 Construction of Offa's Dyke begins.
 786
 Papal legates hold councils in Mercia and Northumbria.
 Mercia regains control of Kent.
 King Cynewulf of Wessex is killed in a surprise attack at his mistress's house in Marten or Merton by Cyneheard the Ætheling (brother of the deposed Sigeberht), who also dies in the attack; Beorhtric takes the throne with the support of his father-in-law Offa. 
 787
 Offa issues the first silver penny.
 At a Synod of Chelsea, Offa has his son consecrated as King; the first such ceremony in England.
 788
 23 September – Ælfwald I of Northumbria is murdered, probably at Chesters, by ealdorman Sicga and succeeded by his first cousin Osred II as king of Northumbria.
 At Offa's urging, the Pope elevates the Bishopric of Lichfield (under Hygeberht) to an Archbishopric.
 789
Charlemagne establishes a trade embargo on the English after failed negotiations for his daughter to marry Offa's son.
Norse activity in the British Isles: Viking raid on England, at Portland.
 790
Æthelred is restored as king of Northumbria following the deposition of Osred II and institutes minting of the styca to replace the silver sceat.
 792
 12 August – death of Jænberht, Archbishop of Canterbury. He is succeeded by Æthelhard.
 October – Osred, the deposed king of Northumbria, returns from exile and is murdered.
 793
 8 June – Vikings raid Lindisfarne.
 794
 6 January? – Vikings raid Jarrow.
 20 May – King Æthelberht II of East Anglia is beheaded on the order of King Offa of Mercia at Sutton Walls, Herefordshire.
 796
 18 April – Æthelred I of Northumbria is murdered at Corbridge by a group led by ealdormen Ealdred and Wada. Osbald succeeds him as king of Northumbria for 27 days before going into exile, initially in Lindisfarne.
 14 May – Eardwulf succeeds as king of Northumbria.
 29 July – Offa of Mercia dies having raided Dyfed and possibly fought in the Battle of Rhuddlan Marsh (perhaps against Caradog ap Meirion). He is buried, maybe at Bedford, and succeeded by his son Ecgfrith who reigns only until December; Wessex regains its independence. Offa's widow Cynethryth becomes abbess of Cookham Abbey.
 December – Ecgfrith is succeeded by Coenwulf of Mercia.
 Kent rebels against Mercia again.
 798
 Kentish rebellion suppressed.
 Saxons kill Caradog ap Meirion, King of Gwynedd.

Births
 c. 700 – Lullus, Archbishop of Mainz (d. 786)

References

 
British history timelines